State is the twenty-fourth studio album by American rock musician Todd Rundgren. It was released on April 9 2013, by Esoteric Recordings. The album was written, performed and produced by Rundgren alone with the exception of vocals by Rachel Haden on "Something From Nothing".
Limited editions included a bonus second disc of a live performance at Paradiso, Amsterdam on November 11, 2012 by Rundgren and The Metropole Orchestra.

Critical reception
State was met with "mixed or average" reviews from critics. At Metacritic, which assigns a weighted average rating out of 100 to reviews from mainstream publications, this release received an average score of 53 based on 9 reviews.

In a review for AllMusic, critic reviewer Stephen Thomas Erlewine wrote: "State never feels forced, either in its execution or concept. Rundgren is pushing the edges of his comfort zone just enough to keep himself stimulated while offering enough melody to satisfy those fans whose concentration usually drifts whenever he wanders." Lee Zimmermman of Blurt said: "Paying a revisit to several classic tracks, it offers ample reassurance that regardless of how he diverges, there’s always the comfort of those earlier endeavors."

Track listing

Personnel
 Todd Rundgren - vocals and all instruments
 Rachel Haden - vocals 
 Mathilde Santing - vocals

Charts

References

Todd Rundgren albums
2013 albums
Albums produced by Todd Rundgren